Asbestos is a carcinogenic fibrous mineral with several applications such as a flame retardant.

It may also refer to:

Places
 Val-des-Sources, a city in Quebec known as Asbestos until 2020
 The former Asbestos Regional County Municipality, Quebec, now renamed Les Sources Regional County Municipality
 Asbestos Range National Park, Tasmania, Australia, is now the Narawntapu National Park
 Port Asbestos (fictional), a fictional location on the Red Green show
 Asbest, town in Russia

Other
 Asbestos-ceramic, types of Scandinavian pottery  BC – 200 AD
 Asbestos Records, a record label
 , a Canadian warship
 AsbestOS, a bootloader to run on Linux on PlayStation 3
 Asbestos, a Hawthorn Leslie saddle tank locomotive